Recoleta railway station (Estación Recoleta), originally known as Palermo railway station (Estación Palermo), was a railway station opened by the Buenos Aires Northern Railway (Ferrocarril del Norte de Buenos Aires) in 1862.  It was located on the Retiro Mitre line, later extended towards San Fernando and Tigre.

The stop was found in the area currently defined by Figueroa Alcorta and Pueyrredón avenues, near to the Basilica of Our Lady of the Pillar and La Recoleta Cemetery.  The small station was closed at some point at the beginning of the twentieth century.

References 

Railway stations in Buenos Aires
Demolished buildings and structures in Argentina
Railway stations opened in 1862
1862 establishments in Argentina
Buildings and structures in Buenos Aires
Defunct railway stations in Argentina